Qutb Shahi architecture is the distinct style of Indo-Islamic architecture developed during the reign of the Qutb Shahi dynasty, also known as the Golconda Sultanate.

Qutb Shahi buildings are seen in the city of Hyderabad and its surroundings. The Golconda Fort, which predates the founding of the city is the earliest example. The style reached its zenith during the reign of Muhammad Quli Qutb Shah, who founded the city of Hyderabad and constructed the Charminar as its centerpiece.

The style is similar to that of the Bahmani Sultanate and other Deccan Sultanates, whose monuments can be seen in Gulbarga, Bijapur, and Bidar. It is heavily influenced by Persian architecture.

Several buildings in the style were put by UNESCO on its "tentative list" to become a World Heritage Site in 2014, with others in the region, under the name Monuments and Forts of the Deccan Sultanate (despite there being a number of different sultanates).

Features 
The Qutb Shahi buildings consist of:

 Expansive mosques and palaces built out of granite
 Inscriptions including Persian poetry and verses from the Quran
 Heavy stucco ornamental work and jali latticed screens

History

Golconda Fort 

The Golconda Fort is the earliest example of the style.

Later architecture

Qutb Shahi tombs 
The Qutb Shahi tombs are the necropolis of the Qutb Shahi rulers, set in a vast garden on the outskirts of the Golconda Fort. The tombs share a common features: an onion dome atop a cube surrounded by an arcade with rich ornamental details, with small minarets featuring floral motifs.

Charminar 
The Charminar is one of the most recognizable examples of Qutb Shahi architecture. It was built by Muhammad Quli Qutb Shah in 1591 as a centerpiece for the newly built capital city of Hyderabad. The Charminar is a large building, square in plan, having an arch in each of its faces and a lofty decagonal minaret at each of its angles. To the south of the Charminar is the Mecca Masjid, which is one of the largest mosques of India.

To the north of the Charminar is the Gulzar Houz fountain, which is surrounded by four arches called the Char Kaman. The arches are simple and do not have many embellishments. There used to be other Qutb Shahi palaces, as well as a rose garden in the vicinity, but they were probably destroyed during the Siege of Golconda.

Other monuments 
Another early structure was the Purana Pul, built in 1578 across the Musi River.

The Qutb Shahi rulers built elaborate caravanserais, or resthouses, including the Shaikpet Sarai and Taramati Baradari. The former had had 30 rooms, stables for horses and camels, a mosque and a tomb of an unknown sufi saint.

Other mosques built during this time include the Khairtabad Mosque, Hayat Bakshi Mosque, Musheerabad Masjid, and Kulsum Begum Mosque.

The Qutb Shahi rulers also made considerable additions to the Gandikota Fort.

References

Bibliography